The Little Lake City School District is a small K-8 public school district in Los Angeles County, California.  , LLCSD serves about 4,900 students.

The school district serves portions of Santa Fe Springs, Downey, and Norwalk. Students continue their high school education at Santa Fe High School in the Whittier Union High School District.

Governance

The current members of the Board of Education are:

Janet Rock,
Gabriel Jimenez,
Richard Martinez,
Dora Sandoval,
and
Hilda Zamora

The current superintendent is:

William Crean, Ed.D.

Cabinet:

Sonya Cuellar, Assistant Superintendent, Personnel Services
Manuel Correa, Assistant Superintendent, Business Services
Monica Johnson, Administrator, Educational Services

School List

Middle schools

Lakeside Middle School
Lake Center Middle School

Elementary schools
Studebaker Elementary School 
Cresson Elementary School 
Jersey Elementary School 
Lakeland Elementary School 
Lakeview Elementary School 
Paddison Elementary School 
William Orr Elementary School

Awards 
•National School to Watch
•California Gold Ribbon School
•Title I Academic Achievement Award School
•California Distinguished School Award
•California Business for Education Excellence

Main Offices
The Little Lake City School District offices are located on Pioneer Boulevard in Santa Fe Springs.

External links
 

School districts in Los Angeles County, California
Norwalk, California